Lisa Howze (born August 5, 1973) is a former member of the Michigan House of Representatives.

Early life
Howze was born on August 5, 1973 in Detroit.

Education
Howze graduated from Cass Technical High School in 1991, from Ross School of Business in accounting, and earned a Master of Science from Walsh College.

Career
Howze is an accountant. On November 2, 2010, Johnson was elected to the Michigan House of Representatives where he represented the 2nd district from January 12, 2011 to 2012. Howze unsuccessfully ran in the Democratic primary for the position of mayor of Detroit.

References

Living people
American accountants
Women accountants
Politicians from Detroit
Cass Technical High School alumni
Ross School of Business alumni
Walsh College alumni
African-American women in politics
African-American state legislators in Michigan
Women state legislators in Michigan
Democratic Party members of the Michigan House of Representatives
21st-century American politicians
21st-century American women politicians
20th-century African-American women
20th-century African-American people
21st-century African-American women
21st-century African-American politicians
1973 births
20th-century American people